Giovanni Paternò or in latin Johannes de Paternione (died 1511) was a Roman Catholic prelate who served as Archbishop of Palermo (1489 –1511) and Bishop of Malta (1479 –1489).

Biography
On 8 Jan 1479, Giovanni Paternò was appointed by Pope Sixtus IV as Bishop of Malta. On 6 Jul 1489, he was appointed by Pope Innocent VIII as Archbishop of Palermo. He served as Archbishop of Palermo until his death in 1511.

References

External links and additional sources
 (for Chronology of Bishops) 
 (for Chronology of Bishops) 

1511 deaths
16th-century Roman Catholic bishops in Sicily
Bishops appointed by Pope Sixtus IV
15th-century Roman Catholic bishops in Malta
Clergy from Palermo
Bishops of Malta